The Monts d'Arrée, or Menezioù Are in Breton, are an ancient mountain range in western Brittany, which forms part of the Armorican massif. Historically it marked the border of the regions of Cornouaille and Léon.

The mounts constitute rocks dramatically emerging from the land, running north-east - south-west.

References

External links 

 Statistic concerning Breton mountains.

Mountain ranges of Brittany
Brittany region articles needing translation from French Wikipedia